Malaysia competed in the 1989 Southeast Asian Games as the host nation in Kuala Lumpur from 20 to 31 August 1989.

Medal summary

Medals by sport

Medallists

Football

Men's tournament
Group B 

Semifinal

Gold medal match

References

1989
Nations at the 1989 Southeast Asian Games